Woodhaven High School is a public high school in the township of Brownstown, and located within the Woodhaven-Brownstown School District. Located at 24787 Van Horn Road, Brownstown, MI, just west of Interstate 75. The current population of the school is 1,400 and the school includes grades 10th-12th. Woodhaven's mascot is the Warrior and the school colors are purple and white. Woodhaven High School competes in the Downriver League: an athletic association consisting of Woodhaven and 8 other Downriver area high schools.

References

External links 
 Woodhaven High School

Public high schools in Michigan
Educational institutions established in 1972
Schools in Wayne County, Michigan
1972 establishments in Michigan